The 2008–09 South Florida Bulls women's basketball team represented the University of South Florida in the 2008–09 NCAA Division I women's basketball season. The Bulls ended the season with 27 wins and the 27th win of the season for the Bulls was the best in USF history - for men or women - and the highest win total by any Division I team in the state of Florida.  USF capped their sixth postseason appearance by winning the 2009 WNIT Tournament.

Exhibition

Regular season

Roster

Schedule
The Bulls participated in the USF Shootout on November 15 and 16.
The Bulls participated in the Paradise Jam from November 27 to 29. The Bulls finished second in the Reef Division.

Player stats

Postseason

Big East Tournament

WNIT Tournament
Quarterfinal (Sunday, March 29)
South Florida 80, St. Bonaventure 66
Semifinal (Wednesday, April 1)
South Florida 82, Boston College 65
Championship (Saturday, April 4)
South Florida 75, Kansas 71

WNIT Player Stats

In the WNIT championship, the stat leaders were as follows:

Awards and honors
Alexis Givands, USF Shootout All-Tournament Team
Shantia Grace, All-Big East point guard,
Janae Stokes, USF Shootout Most Valuable Player
Jasmine Wynne, USF Shootout All-Tournament Team

Team players drafted into the WNBA
No one from the Bulls was selected in the 2009 WNBA Draft.

References

South Florida Bulls women's basketball seasons
South Florida
Women's National Invitation Tournament championship seasons